Sir Rabbie Langanai Namaliu  (born 3 April 1947) is a Papua New Guinea politician. He served as the fourth Prime Minister of Papua New Guinea. from 4 July 1988 to 17 July 1992 as leader of the Pangu Party.

Biography

An ethnic Tolai, Sir Rabbie comes from East New Britain. He was educated in Papua New Guinea and in Canada, at the University of Victoria in Victoria, British Columbia. Prior to his political career he was an academic in the field of political science at the University of Papua New Guinea.

After Papua New Guinea's independence in 1975, Namaliu was one of four leading civil servants, together with Mekere Morauta, Anthony Siaguru and Charles Lepani who led the formation of public administration and public policy in PNG's immediate post-independence years. They were often called "Gang of Four". 

Before becoming prime minister, he served as foreign minister for the first time, from 1982 to 1984, by this time beginning his long alliance with Michael Somare, who was prime minister at that time and served as foreign minister while Namaliu was prime minister. He was appointed foreign minister in 2002, as part of the National Alliance Party government of Michael Somare. He served as foreign minister until 12 July 2006 when he became finance minister during a cabinet reshuffle. Sir Rabbie subsequently lost his seat of Kokopo Open at the 2007 Election but has not ruled out a future return to politics. He lost his cabinet post when the new government, again led by Somare, took office in August 2007.

As a former prime minister of Papua New Guinea, he is a member of the Imperial Privy Council since 1989 and is styled "The Right Honourable".

Namaliu married the civil servant, Margaret Nakikus, in 1987. She headed the country's National Planning Office. They had two sons, Isaac and Langanai (Rabbie Jnr.), and an adopted daughter, Joy. After his defeat in parliament in 1992 he left politics to be with Nakikus, who had incurable leukaemia and was in hospital in Brisbane, Australia. She died in 1992.

References

1947 births
Living people
Foreign Ministers of Papua New Guinea
Members of the National Parliament of Papua New Guinea
Members of the Privy Council of the United Kingdom
Prime Ministers of Papua New Guinea
Speakers of the National Parliament of Papua New Guinea
Knights Commander of the Order of St Michael and St George
Grand Companions of the Order of Logohu
People from East New Britain Province
Pangu Party politicians
University of Papua New Guinea alumni
University of Victoria alumni
Academic staff of the University of Papua New Guinea
20th-century Papua New Guinean politicians